The Honduras Gazette, published as The Honduras Gazette and Commercial Advertiser, was the first newspaper and government gazette in colonial Belize. It ran from 1 July 1826 until sometime during 18291838, being succeeded on 29 September 1838 by the Belize Advertiser.

History

Prelude 

In the 17th, 18th, and early 19th centuries, the Baymen's printing needs are thought to have been met by overseas presses and papers. On 6 December 1825, the settlement's Magistrates resolved to procure a press 'for the purpose of printing and preserving the records and laws of the Settlement.' Consequently, an iron letterpress was set up by James Cruickshank, whose first substantive work is thought to have been an almanac, published 'by authority of the Magistrates' on 9 March 1826.

Establishment 

The first issue of the Gazette was published on 1 July 1826. It contained an introductory notice to the public, shipping, overseas, foreign, and local intelligence, government notices, and various commercial advertisements.

In their notice to the public, the Gazette editors committed themselves to rendering the paper 'useful, convenient, and amusing to the community.' The editors expounded on the advantages of an impartial press, noting

Run

Editorship
The Gazette is thought to have been edited by the Magistrates until 17 March 1827 (vol. 1 no. 38), by Cruickshank until 5 November 1827 (vol. 2 no. 88), 'when, on that day, the Legislative Assembly at their Meeting, in their Wisdom, took it out of his hands, by reason of his intemperence, and very properly appointed a Committee, for its better Government.' It has been noted that the Gazette'''s editorials were usually quite sharp, strident, or belligerent, especially in contradistinction with editorials in contemporary newspapers of neighbouring Hispanic republics.

Coverage
The Gazette covered local occurrences and legislative and judicial proceedings. Like other West Indian newspapers, it published government notices, shipping intelligence, and overseas and foreign occurrences gleaned from British, American, and West Indian papers. Especial attention was paid to reports received from neighbouring Hispanic republics, as the paper's audience were taken by the 'decidedly unsettled affairs' in these states. It has been noted that the Gazette, in contrast to contemporary newspapers of Hispanic Central America, focussed much more on mercantile affairs, as opposed to political ones.

Normal issues were usually four pages of 12 by 9 inches, with copy laid out in two columns. Issues were sometimes supplemented.

Circulation
The Gazette is thought to have had limited circulation, given its small audience (under 4,000), and relatively high cost of subscription ($8 per annum). This shortfall is believed to have been made up for by advertising revenue, which is similarly thought to have been sufficient, given the relatively high cost of advertising in the paper. Despite its small run, at least some issues circulated in nearby British settlements in the Bay Islands and the Mosquito Shore, and further overseas in the West Indies, England, and the United States.

Disestablishment

It is not certain when exactly the Gazette ceased publication, though its run is thought to have ended sometime during 18291838. A copy of the issue for 27 June 1829 is the latest extant copy known. The paper was succeeded on 29 September 1838 by the Belize Advertiser.

 Legacy 

The Gazette's keen coverage of affairs in Hispanic Central America continued in later 19th century newspapers of colonial Belize. The paper is thought to have brought colonial Belize to greater attention in neighbouring Hispanic republics, as 19th century newspapers of the latter had largely ignored the settlement until after the Gazette'''s founding.

Notes and references

Explanatory footnotes

Short citations

Full citations 

 
 
 
 
 
 
 
 
 
 
 
 
 
 

Publications established in 1826
19th century in Belize
Newspapers published in Belize
Weekly newspapers published in Belize

British colonial gazettes